The 2007 Latvian Figure Skating Championships were the national championships of the 2006–07 figure skating season. Skaters competed in the disciplines of ladies' singles.

Senior results

Ladies
Rūta Gajauskaitė of Lithuania was a guest competitor.

External links
 results

Latvian Figure Skating Championships, 2007